HD 115211 is a single star in the southern constellation of Musca. It has an orange hue and is faintly visible to the naked eye with an apparent visual magnitude of 4.86. Its distance from Earth is approximately 1,370 light years based on parallax, and it is drifting closer to the Sun with a radial velocity of −10 km/s. It has an absolute magnitude of −2.94.

It is an aging bright giant/supergiant star with a stellar classification of K2 Ib-II. It is a suspected variable star of unknown type, with a brightness that has been measured ranging from 4.83 down to 4.87. It is an estimated 40 million years old, with 7.1 times the mass of the Sun. With the supply of hydrogen exhausted at its core, it has expanded to 123 times the Sun's radius. It is radiating 3,849 times the luminosity of the Sun from its swollen photosphere at an effective temperature of 4,097 K.

References

K-type supergiants
K-type bright giants
Suspected variables
Musca (constellation)
Durchmusterung objects
115211
064820
5002